Fall River Township is located in LaSalle County, Illinois. As of the 2010 census, its population was 763 and it contained 339 housing units. Fall River Township was formed from Grand Rapids Township on an unknown date.

Geography

Demographics

References

External links
US Census
City-data.com
Illinois State Archives

Townships in LaSalle County, Illinois
Townships in Illinois